The Maracas heart-tongued frog (Phyllodytes tuberculosus)  is a species of frog in the family Hylidae endemic to Brazil. Its natural habitats are subtropical or tropical dry forests, dry savanna, and moist savanna. It is threatened by habitat loss.

References

Phyllodytes
Endemic fauna of Brazil
Amphibians described in 1966
Taxonomy articles created by Polbot